Peach is a color that is named for the pale color of the interior flesh of the peach fruit. This name may also be substituted for "peachy". Like the color apricot, the color peach is paler than most actual peach fruits and seems to have been formulated (like the color apricot) primarily to create a pastel palette of colors for interior design.

Peach

The color peach approximates the color of the interior flesh of that variety of peaches known as white peaches.

The first recorded use of peach as a color name in English was in 1588.

Etymology

The etymology of the color peach (and the fruit):  the word comes from the Middle English peche, derived from Middle French, in turn derived from Latin persica, i.e., the fruit from Persia. In actuality, the ultimate origin of the peach fruit was from China.

Variations

Peach puff

Displayed at right is the web color peach puff.

Peach

Displayed at right is the deep tone of peach called peach in Crayola crayons. Prior to 1962, it was known as flesh, but the name was changed to peach, ostensibly in recognition of the Civil Rights Movement.

In nature
Fungi
 The peach-colored fly agaric is a peach-colored mushroom.

In culture
Interior Design
 In Art Deco interior design of the 1920s and 1930s, peach-colored mirrors (as well as blue mirrors) were often seen installed in exclusive luxury homes, and in nightclubs and hotels catering to the upper classes. Peach color is also recommended for bedroom to have a good sleep.

Religion
 The color peach represents immortality in Chinese culture because The Peach Tree of Immortality, long thought to be on a mountainside somewhere in the Tian Shan in western China, and which blooms only once every 3,000 years, is a key concept in the mythology of the Taoist religion. (The color amaranth represents immortality in Western civilization.)

Sexuality
 In the bandana code of the gay leather subculture, wearing a peach bandana means that one is a "bear" or a "cub" looking for a bear.

See also
 List of colors

References

be:Персікавы колер
ru:Персиковый цвет
Simple:Peach (color)
sv:Persika